Caucasus or Caucasia is a geographic region in Eurasia.

Caucasus may also refer to:

Places
North Caucasus, also Ciscaucasus or Ciscaucasia
South Caucasus, also Transcaucasus or Transcaucasia
Western Caucasus, a western region of the Caucasus in Southern Russia

Subdivisions of the Russian Empire
Caucasus Viceroyalty (1785–96), capital Yekaterinograd
Caucasus Oblast (1785-1790), became a part of Caucasus Governorate
Caucasus Governorate (1802–1822)
Caucasus Oblast (1822-1847), successor of Caucasus Governorate
Caucasus Viceroyalty (1801–1917), capital Tiflis
Caucasus Military District (1865–1917)

Mountains
 Caucasus Mountains, a mountain range in the region
 Greater Caucasus, the major mountain range of the Caucasus Mountains
 Lesser Caucasus,  second of the two main mountain ranges of Caucasus mountains

Other
 Caucasus (Fabergé egg), a jewelled enameled Easter egg
 Caucasus (horse) (1972–c. 1991), thoroughbred racehorse
 Caucasus Cable System, a Georgian-owned submarine communications cable
 Caucasus Campaign (1735)
 Caucasus Greeks
 Caucasus: Nanatsuki no Nie, a 2009 visual novel from Innocent Grey
Kamen Rider Caucasus, the main antagonist of the Japanese tokusatsu movie,  Kamen Rider Kabuto: God Speed Love

See also
 Caucasia (disambiguation)
 Caucasian (disambiguation)
 Kavkazsky (disambiguation)
 North Caucasus (disambiguation)